Susan Carscallen (born March 5, 1955) is a Canadian former ice dancer.  With partner Eric Gillies, she competed at the 1976 Winter Olympics and won the gold medal at the 1977 Canadian Figure Skating Championships.

Carscallen was born in Sudbury, Ontario.

Results
(with Eric Gillies)

Notes

Navigation

1955 births
Canadian female ice dancers
Figure skaters at the 1976 Winter Olympics
Olympic figure skaters of Canada
Sportspeople from Greater Sudbury
Living people